The Thin Pink Line is a 1998 mockumentary directed by Joe Dietl and Michael Irpino.

The title is a parody of Errol Morris' documentary The Thin Blue Line, which raised questions about the conviction of a prison inmate on death row.

Cast

 Carrie Aizley as Jocelyn Silverberg
 Jennifer Aniston as Clove
 Alexis Arquette as Mr. Ed
 Andrea Bendewald as Dust
 Megan Cavanagh as Mrs. Ledbetter
 Margaret Cho as Asia Blue / Terry
 Jerry Collins as Tom Phillips
 David Cross as Tommy Dantsbury
 Bruce Daniels as Randall Overbee
 Diane Delano as Sgt. Dot Jenkins
 Tate Donovan as Simon
 Illeana Douglas as Julia Bullock
 Nora Dunn as Sandy Delongpre
 Christine Elise as Darby
 Will Ferrell as Darren Clark
 Janeane Garofalo as Joyce Wintergarden-Dingle
 Melanie Hutsell as Yvette Evy
 Michael Irpino as Chauncey Caldwell
 Bob Joles as Mr. Langstrom
 Laura Kightlinger as Amber Jean Rose
 Phil LaMarr as Jimmy 'Licorice Whip' Wilson
 Anne Meara as Mrs. Langstrom
 Joel Murray as Bartender
 Mike Myers as Tim Broderick
 Taylor Negron as Stewart Sterling
 Brett Paesel as Karen Hill
 Sam Pancake as Randy Nephews
 Jason Priestley as Hunter Green
 Mary Lynn Rajskub as Suzy Smokestack
 Andy Richter as Ken Irpine
 Richard Riehle as Governor Eastman
 Jeff Rosenthal as Donald Elkins
 Robin Ruzan as Tammy Broderick
 David Schwimmer as Kelly Goodish / J.T.
 Rusty Schwimmer as Nora Finkelheimer
 Molly Shannon as Aanl
 Sarah Thyre as Diane Edbetter-Irpine
 Maura Tierney as Suzanne
 Vincent Ventresca as Bob
 Tuc Watkins as Ted
 Susan Yeagley as Chauncey's New Wife
 Joe Dietl as Royce Cannon

References

Sources

External links 
 

American mockumentary films
1998 films
1998 comedy films
American satirical films
American independent films
American LGBT-related films
LGBT-related comedy films
1998 LGBT-related films
1990s English-language films
1990s American films